Bromelia villosa is a plant species in the genus Bromelia. This species is native to Bolivia.

References

villosa
Flora of Bolivia